The Shanghai International Convention Center (SHICC) is a convention center in Lujiazui Financial District in Pudong New Area, Shanghai, China, built in 1999. The building is adjacent to Shanghai's skyline of spectacular skyscrapers, including Oriental Pearl Tower, Shanghai Tower and Shanghai World Financial Center. Visitors in the center can have a panorama view of the Bund of Shanghai right across the Huangpu River.

The center consists of a grand banquet hall, a press conference center, 34 multifunctional conference halls and a luxury hotel. It served as the main venue during the 2001 APEC Summit.

References 

Pudong
1999 establishments in China
Convention and exhibition centers in China